Garu District is one of the 15 districts in Upper East Region, Ghana. Originally it was formerly part of the then-larger Garu-Tempane District in 2004. The southeast part of the district was split off to create Tempane District on 15 February 2018 and the remaining part has been renamed as Garu District. The district assembly is located in the eastern part of Upper East Region. Its administrative capital is Garu.

See also
 Belingogo, a small community within Garu District

Sources

References

Districts of Upper East Region